Kings or King's may refer to:

Monarchs: The sovereign heads of states and/or nations, with the male being kings
One of several works known as the "Book of Kings":
The Books of Kings part of the Bible, divided into two parts
The Shahnameh, an 11th-century epic Persian poem
The Morgan Bible, a French medieval picture Bible
The Pararaton, a 16th-century Javanese history of southeast Asia
The plural of any king

Business
Kings Family Restaurants, a chain of restaurants in Pennsylvania and Ohio
Kings Food Markets, a chain supermarket in northern New Jersey
King's Favourites, a brand of cigarettes
King's Variety Store, a chain of stores in the USA
King's (defunct discount store), a defunct chain of discount stores in the USA

Education
King's College (disambiguation), various colleges
 King's School (disambiguation), various schools 
 The King's Academy (disambiguation), various academies

Electoral districts
King's (New Brunswick electoral district) (1867–1903)
King's (Prince Edward Island electoral district) (1892–1966)
Kings (electoral district), Nova Scotia (1867–1924)
Kings (provincial electoral district), Nova Scotia (1867–1956)

Entertainment

Kings (game), a popular drinking game also known as King's Cup

Film and television

Kings (Australian TV series), an Australian TV series
Kings (U.S. TV series), an American TV series
Oi Vasiliades ("The Kings"), a Greek comedy show
Los Reyes (TV series) ("The Kings"), a Colombian drama
"The Kings" (Emmerdale), a 2006–2007 Emmerdale storyline
Kings (2007 film), a 2007 Irish language film by Tom Collins
Kings (2017 film), a 2017 film starring Halle Berry and Daniel Craig

Music

"Kings" (The Pierces song), a song by The Pierces on the album Creation
"Kings" (Steely Dan song), a song by rock group Steely Dan on the album Can't Buy a Thrill
The Kings, a Canadian rock band formed in 1977
Kings (musician), a New Zealand producer, rapper and singer-songwriter
Kings (album), by I Am Empire

Places
Kings Bay (disambiguation), the name of several bays
Kings County (disambiguation)
King County (disambiguation)
Kings, Coles County, Illinois, an unincorporated community in Coles County, Illinois
Kings, Ogle County, Illinois, an unincorporated community in Ogle County, Illinois
Kings Dominion, an amusement park in Doswell, Virginia
Kings Island, an amusement park in Mason, Ohio

Sports
Barangay Ginebra Kings, a Philippine basketball team
Brooklyn Kings (rugby league), a rugby league team in Brooklyn, New York, USA
Chennai Super Kings, an Indian Premier League team based in Chennai, India
Chittagong Kings, former name of the Chattogram Challengers, a Bangladesh Premier League team based in Chittagong, Bangladesh
Cincinnati Kings, a USL Premier Development League soccer team based in Cincinnati, Ohio
Eastern Province Kings, the former name of the Eastern Province Elephants, a provincial rugby union team based in Port Elizabeth, South Africa
Karachi Kings, a Pakistan Super League team based in Karachi, Pakistan
Kings (handball), also known as "Chinese handball"
Kings XI Punjab, an Indian Premier League team based in Mohali, India
The Kings of Wrestling or The Kings of Wrestling (TNA)
Los Angeles Kings, an NHL team based in Los Angeles, California
Powell River Kings, a junior ice hockey team in Powell River, British Columbia, Canada
Rethymno Cretan Kings B.C., a Greek basketball team
Sacramento Kings, an NBA team based in Sacramento, California
Southern Kings, a Super Rugby team based in Port Elizabeth, South Africa
Sydney Kings, an Australian basketball team

See also
 Kings River (disambiguation)
King (disambiguation)